Nicolás Tagliani (born January 30, 1975 in Buenos Aires, Argentina) was an Argentine footballer.

He has played for different clubs in Argentina, Chile, Colombia, Bolivia, Peru, Venezuela, Switzerland and Greece. He played as a centre forward.

Honours

Club
Colo-Colo
 Primera División de Chile (1): 2002 Clausura

Alianza Lima
 Peruvian Primera División (1): 2003 Descentralizado

Jorge Wilstermann
 Bolivian Primera División (1): 2004

Unión Atlético Maracaibo
 Venezuelan Primera División (1): 2004–05

External links
BDFA Profile

1975 births
Living people
Argentine footballers
Argentine expatriate footballers
Bolivian Primera División players
Chilean Primera División players
Categoría Primera A players
Peruvian Primera División players
Venezuelan Primera División players
SR Delémont players
Cobreloa footballers
Club Deportivo Palestino footballers
Colo-Colo footballers
Estudiantes de La Plata footballers
C.D. Jorge Wilstermann players
UA Maracaibo players
Real Cartagena footballers
Club Alianza Lima footballers
Latina Calcio 1932 players
Unión Temuco footballers
Expatriate footballers in Bolivia
Expatriate footballers in Chile
Expatriate footballers in Colombia
Expatriate footballers in Greece
Expatriate footballers in Italy
Expatriate footballers in Peru
Expatriate footballers in Switzerland
Expatriate footballers in Venezuela
Association football forwards
Footballers from Buenos Aires